Don Kihot is a 1961 experimental animated short by Vlado Kristl for Zagreb Film. It is loosely based on Don Quixote by Miguel de Cervantes.

Themes and reception
The author reduced the characters in the short to Klee-style ideograms, with backgrounds being represented by abstract frescoes, all of which is accompanied by atonal music. The short was blacklisted during the former Yugoslavia due to its rigid classification of art and society, which Don Kihot challenged. The short won a number of prizes at international festivals, such as the main prize at International Short Film Festival Oberhausen in 1962. It is described as a "difficult but very poetic film" and a magnum opus for Kristl. Speed and Wilsom state that the short "presents the eccentric individualist assailed by all the forces of the modern state - guns, radar, tanks, planes, patrols, armies - and in some amazing way the nonconformist deviationist Don triumphs over them all".

References

External links

Don Kihot on Vimeo

1961 animated films
1961 films
Croatian animated short films
Yugoslav animated short films
Zagreb Film films
Films based on Don Quixote
Independent animation